The Rural Training School is public tertiary health institution in Kintampo formerly in the Brong Ahafo Region and currently in the Bono East Region of Ghana.  The school is in the Kintampo District. The activities of the institution is supervised by the Ministry of Education. The Nurses and Midwifery Council (NMC) is the regulates the activities, curriculum and examination of the student nurses and midwives. The council's mandate Is enshrined under section 4(1) of N.R.C.D 117.

References

Nursing and midwifery colleges in Ghana
Bono East Region